Maple leaf cream cookies (also called "maple leaf creme cookies", "maple leaf cookies", "maple creme cookies", "maple leaf cremes",  and "maple cremes") are a Canadian sandwich cookie.

The cream filling is maple-flavoured, and may contain real maple syrup. The cookies are shaped like a maple leaf, a national symbol of Canada.

Several Canadian companies produce maple cremes, mainly for the domestic market, although they have a growing following in the United States.

References

Cookie sandwiches
Canadian desserts
Food made from maple